"Fishin' in the Dark" is a song written by Wendy Waldman and Jim Photoglo, and recorded by American country music group Nitty Gritty Dirt Band, with Jimmy Ibbotson singing lead.  It was released on June 7, 1987, as the second single from their album Hold On. It reached number-one on the U.S. and Canadian country charts.  It was the band's third number-one single on the U.S. country music charts and the second in Canada.  After it became available for download, it has sold over a million digital copies by 2015. It was certified Platinum by the RIAA on September 12, 2014.

Content
The premise of the song is a couple contemplating a late-night fishing expedition. Specifically, the adventurers plan to make their way to an undisclosed river and chart constellations during an evening in which a full moon is present. Furthermore, the tentative date for this excursion is set in the late spring to early summer.

Cover versions 
Ed Bruce originally recorded the song on his 1986 album Night Things.
Canadian country band Emerson Drive recorded their version of the song on their 2004 album What If? A live version recorded in Dallas, Texas during 2004 was released as a digital single in 2005.
Garth Brooks recorded his version of the song for his 2005 album The Lost Sessions and again for his 2013 box set Blame It All on My Roots: Five Decades of Influences.
Irish Country singer Nathan Carter released his version of the song on his 2011 album Time Of My Life.
The Ozark Mountain Daredevils cover the song on a rare Album (CD) named Heart of the Country released in 1987
 The Swon Brothers covered it during season 4 of The Voice and subsequently a studio version was released.
 Red Marlow performed a duet of the song with Ryan Scripps for The Battles on Season 13 of The Voice.
 The accapella group Home Free recorded and create their version of the song in 2015 with a Mash-up with Little Big Town's Boondocks.

Charts and certification

Weekly charts

Certifications

Year-end charts

References 

1987 singles
1986 songs
Ed Bruce songs
Nitty Gritty Dirt Band songs
Emerson Drive songs
Garth Brooks songs
Song recordings produced by Josh Leo
Warner Records Nashville singles
Songs written by Wendy Waldman
Songs written by Jim Photoglo